Andersonville is an unincorporated community in Anderson County, Tennessee. Beginning with the 2010 census, it is treated as a census-designated place (CDP). The CDP had a population of 472 in 2010.

Andersonville is located on Tennessee State Route 61 east of Norris and south of Norris Lake. The Andersonville post office is assigned zip code 37705, which includes much of northeastern Anderson County and portions of adjacent Union County.

History

The community's founding family donated land for the community's first grade school, which was started in 1830. It was replaced in 1873 by Big Valley Academy, a grade school financed through stock purchases by local citizens.  It was renamed Andersonville Institute in 1898, after the Clinton Baptist Association purchased the school building and added high school grades. Andersonville Institute was served by a pair of dormitories for boarding students, who comprised the majority of the high school enrollment. The Anderson County School Board assumed ownership and responsibility for the school in 1923.  In 1938 Andersonville's high school students were moved to the new Norris High School in Norris and Andersonville's school became an elementary school again. The old two-story school building was torn down in 1958 and replaced by a new single-story building on the same site that reopened three years later as Andersonville Elementary School.

Demographics

The 2010 census population of the Andersonville CDP was 472, including 366 people over 18 and 106 children under 18 years old. The population was 98.5% white, 0.4% Native American or Alaskan native, 0.2% Asian, 0.2% Native Hawaiian and Other Pacific Islander, 0.2% some other race, and 0.4% two or more races. The Hispanic or Latino population, including people of any race, totaled 1.5%.

Climate
The climate in this area is characterized by hot, humid summers and generally mild to cool winters.  According to the Köppen Climate Classification system, Andersonville has a humid subtropical climate, abbreviated "Cfa" on climate maps.

References

External links

Census-designated places in Anderson County, Tennessee
Census-designated places in Tennessee
Unincorporated communities in Tennessee